The Amarapura–Rāmañña Nikāya is the larger of the two Buddhist monastic orders in Sri Lanka, the other being the Siyam Nikāya.

History

The order came into existence on August 16, 2019 through the union of the Amarapura Nikāya and Rāmañña Nikāya, which had been in the works for a number of years. Koṭugoḍa Dhammāvāsa Thera notably underscored that there was no need to maintain two separate orders.

Forest monasticism

Siri Kalyāṇī Yogassama Santhā, an independent division of the Amarapura–Rāmañña Nikāya, is currently the largest body of forest monks and nuns in Sri Lanka.

See also
 Theravāda Buddhism
 Buddhism in Sri Lanka
 Siyam Nikāya

References

External links
Official website

Religious organizations established in 2019
2019 establishments in Sri Lanka
Theravada Buddhist orders
Schools of Buddhism founded in Sri Lanka